Clapton Football Club is a football club based in Plaistow, East London.

History
Established in 1877 under the name Downs Football Club and initially based at Hackney Downs in Lower Clapton, the club originally played in dark blue shirts and white shorts, with a distinctive white Maltese cross on the left breast. The following year the club adopted its current name. Clapton began competing in the FA Cup in 1888–89, and in 1890 became the first club from Great Britain to play in continental Europe, defeating a Belgian XI 7–0 in Antwerp.

In 1894 Clapton became founder members of the Southern League, alongside Southampton, Luton Town, Millwall and Reading, and were placed in Division One. Finishing eighth in a nine-club league they were forced to play a test match to avoid relegation to Division Two, defeating Sheppey United 5–1. The following season saw them finish eighth again, but  despite winning the test match against the 1st Scots Guards, the club resigned from the league as several of the other clubs turned professional.

The 1904–05 season saw Clapton reach the final of the FA Amateur Cup for the first time, losing 3–2 to West Hartlepool. The following season they became founder members of the Isthmian League, finishing as runners-up in its inaugural season. They won the FA Amateur Cup in 1906–07, defeating Stockton 2–1 in the final. In 1908–09, they won the Amateur Cup again with a 6–0 win against Eston United. The 1910–11 season saw them win their first Isthmian League title, and in 1914–15 the club won a third Amateur Cup with a 1–0 victory over Bishop Auckland in the final.

Clapton won another Isthmian League title in 1922–23. The following season saw them win their fourth Amateur Cup, defeating Erith & Belvedere 3–0 in the final. They went on to retain their title as Amateur Cup holders the following season, beating Southall FC 2–1 at the Old Den. In the same season, three Clapton players were selected for the England national team. In 1925–26 the club reached the third round of the FA Cup after wins against Norwich City and Ilford in the first and second round. They were eventually knocked out, losing 3–2 at 'home' to Swindon Town, a match that was played at West Ham's Boleyn Ground and drew a crowd of 27,000. The club would go on to reach the first round of the FA Cup again in 1926–27, 1927–28 and 1957–58, losing to Brentford, Luton Town and Queens Park Rangers respectively.

In 1975–76 Clapton finished bottom of Division One of the Isthmian League, dropping down to Division Two, which was renamed Division One in 1977. At the end of the 1981–82 season they were relegated to Division Two, but bounced back at the first time of asking as champions. The club won the Essex Senior Cup for a third time in 1984, but were relegated again at the end of the 1984–85 season, dropping into Division Two North. In 1991 the club was placed in Division Three after league reorganisation, which later became Division Two due to further reorganisation. In 2005–06 Clapton finished in bottom of the league for the second consecutive season, and subsequently joined the Essex Senior League after Division Two was disbanded. 

In 2015–16, the club won the Gordon Brasted Memorial Trophy, beating Stansted 4–0 in the final.

Ground
Clapton originally played on pitches at Hackney Downs, before moving to North Millfield in Lower Clapton in 1880. The club then briefly played at Elm Farm and Pilgrims Road and then relocated to the Old Spotted Dog Ground in Forest Gate in 1887 after it was vacated by St Bartholomew's Hospital. The first match at the new ground was played on 29 September 1888, a 1–1 draw with Old Carthusians in front of a crowd of 700.

During the 2001–02 Isthmian League season, Clapton spent the entire season playing away from the Old Spotted Dog due to the club's failure to undertake the Isthmian League's required ground improvements. Clapton played the majority of their home fixtures at Aveley's Mill Field ground, as well as groundsharing with Purfleet, Barking & East Ham United, Wembley and Hertford Town. Clapton eventually returned to the Old Spotted Dog in 2003.

In the opening weeks of the 2019–20 season, Clapton, and fellow tenants Hackney Wick, were forced to vacate the Old Spotted Dog due to issues at the ground. During Clapton's exile, they played at Redbridge's Oakside Stadium and Aveley's new Parkside ground. On 17 September 2019, it was confirmed that Clapton had not been awarded a lease to remain at the Old Spotted Dog, with breakaway club Clapton Community winning the lease bid. On 12 November 2019, it was announced Clapton would groundshare with Southend Manor at Southchurch Park for the remainder of the season. In July 2020, it was confirmed that Clapton would play at the Terence McMillan Stadium in Plaistow for the forthcoming season.

Supporters
During Clapton's peak in the late 19th century, the club averaged a regular home crowd of 4,000 spectators. During this period, the club were nicknamed the Doggies after their relocation to Forest Gate.

In 2012 a supporters group named the Clapton Ultras was started. The group followed the European ultras tradition and developed around local fans disengaged with modern professional football, migrants to East London and those with an opposition to discrimination and far-right politics. Following the creation of the Ultras, the club's home attendances rose from an average of 20 in 2011–12 to 335 by the 2015–16 season. Two clubs have refused to admit Clapton fans for their matches: Southend Manor and Metropolitan Police. In July 2017, supporters won a high court injunction against Clapton chief executive Vincent McBean, who had attempted to liquidate the charity administering the Old Spotted Dog ground.

In 2018 some supporters formed a breakaway fan-owned club under the name of Clapton Community, joining the Middlesex County League for the 2018–19 season, playing at Wadham Lodge. Two years prior to the formation of Clapton Community, Clapton supporters founded Downs Football Club, with the club name, badge and kit all in homage to the original Downs Football Club of 1878.

Honours
Isthmian League
Champions 1910–11, 1922–23
Division Two champions 1982–83
Essex Senior League
Gordon Brasted Memorial Trophy winners 2016
FA Amateur Cup
Winners 1906–07, 1908–09, 1914–15, 1923–24, 1924–25
London Senior Cup
Winners 1888–89, 1908–09, 1910–11
Essex Senior Cup
Winners 1890–91, 1924–25, 1925–26, 1954–55, 1983–84
Middlesex Senior Cup
Winners 1888–89
Essex Senior Trophy
Winners 1988–89
Essex Thames Side Trophy
Winners 1982–83, 1983–84
AFA Invitational Cup
Winners 1965–66, 1970–71 (shared)
London Charity Cup
Winners 1898–99, 1899–1900, 1901–02, 1902–03, 1923–24
West Ham Charity Cup
Winners 1889–90, 1903–04, 1906–07, 1907–08, 1922–23,  1924–25, 1925–26
London Junior Cup
Winners 1887–88, 1892–93, 1907–08
London County Amateur Cup
Winners 1908–09, 1909–10, 1910–11
Liege Tournament
Joint Winners 1923–24
Worthing Charity Cup
Winners 1926–27
W J Collins Trophy
Winners 1968–69
Visitors' Trophy 
Joint Winners 1968–69
Lee Rackett Memorial Trophy
Winners 1972–73, 1984–85
John Ullman Trophy
Winners 1990–91
Ilford Hospital Cup
Winners 1908–09

Records
Best FA Cup performance: Third round, 1925–26
Best FA Trophy performance: Second qualifying round, 1980–81, 1983–84
Best FA Vase performance: Second round, 1989–90, 1992–93, 2003–04
Record attendance: 12,000 vs Tottenham Hotspur, FA Cup, 1898–99.

See also
Clapton F.C. players
Clapton F.C. managers
Football in London

References

External links
Official website

 
Football clubs in England
Football clubs in London
Association football clubs established in 1877
1877 establishments in England
Forest Gate
Southern Football League clubs
Isthmian League
Essex Senior Football League
Sport in the London Borough of Newham
South Essex League